Francisco Salamone (1897–1959) was an Argentine architect known for designing, in just four years, more than 60 monumental buildings in Buenos Aires Province. He began his work in the city of Villa María, Córdoba doing paving works, a slaughterhouse and the Centenario Square. After several problems and accusations of corruption in the municipality he moved to the province of Buenos Aires. There, Salamone met the provincial governor, the conservative Manuel Fresco of the National Democratic Party. He entrusted Salamone with the task of building different public buildings in the humid pampas, giving him full powers for his projects, encouraging the growth of small towns and cities.

The majority of his work consisted mainly of three types of constructions: municipalities, cemeteries portals and slaughterhouses. He also made squares, porticos, sidewalks, lights, urban furniture and furniture of the municipal palaces. During this period he only built 2 private homes.

When the administration of Governor Fresco ended in 1940, Salamone moved with his family to Buenos Aires City. In 1943 he had to go into exile in Uruguay after being accused of corruption in a paving work in San Miguel de Tucumán. After the charges were withdrawn, he returned to Argentina where he directed multiple urban paving works and only projected 2 buildings of rationalist style and a private house.

Buildings

Squares and Street Furniture

Attributed Works 

For the following works it can not be fully confirmed the authorship of Salamone.

Unbuilt Works

Misattributed Works

References

Notes

Citations

Bibliography 

 
 
 
 
 
 

Salamone, Francisco
Architecture in Argentina